Boris Aleksandrovich Mayorov (born February 11, 1938, in Moscow, Soviet Union) is a retired ice hockey player who played in the Soviet Hockey League.  He played for HC Spartak Moscow.  He was inducted into the Russian and Soviet Hockey Hall of Fame in 1963.

His twin brother Yevgeni Mayorov was an international ice hockey player as well.

External links
Soviet Hockey Hall of Fame

1938 births
Living people
HC Spartak Moscow players
Ice hockey people from Moscow
Olympic medalists in ice hockey
Medalists at the 1964 Winter Olympics
Olympic gold medalists for the Soviet Union
Olympic ice hockey players of the Soviet Union
Ice hockey players at the 1964 Winter Olympics
Ice hockey players at the 1968 Winter Olympics
Russian ice hockey players
IIHF Hall of Fame inductees